The Goat (sometimes also translated Sheep or Ram) is the eighth of the 12-year cycle of animals which appear in the Chinese zodiac related to the Chinese calendar. This zodiacal sign is often referred to as the "Ram" or "Sheep" sign, since the Chinese word yáng is more accurately translated as Caprinae, a taxonomic subfamily that includes both goats and sheep, but contrasts with other animal subfamily types such as Bovinae, Antilopinae, and other taxonomic considerations which may be encountered in the case of the larger family of Bovidae in Chinese mythology, which also includes the Ox (zodiac). The Year of the Goat is associated with the 8th Earthly Branch symbol, 未 (wèi).

Goat or Sheep
The Chinese word yáng refers to both goats and sheep, whereas the terms shānyáng and miányáng refer exclusively to goats and sheep, respectively. In English, the sign (originally based on a horned animal) may be called either. The interpretation of goat or sheep depends on culture. In Vietnamese, the sign is mùi, which is unambiguously goat. In Japan, on the other hand, the sign is hitsuji, sheep; while in Korea and Mongolia, the sign is ram or sheep. Within China, there may be a regional distinction with the zodiacal yáng more likely to be thought of as a goat in the south, while tending to be thought of as a sheep in the north.

Characteristics
The Chinese commonly regard sheep as an auspicious animal, and the year of the sheep, therefore, heralds a year of promise and prosperity. "Yáng" (羊) is a component of another written Chinese characters "xiang" (祥), which means auspiciousness, and the two were interchangeable in ancient Chinese, according to one source. It is also a part of the character "shan" (善), which counts kindness and benevolence as among its meanings.

Individuals born in the zodiac year have been supposed to share certain characteristics with other individuals also born in years of the same animal sign. Similarly, years sharing the same animal sign have been supposed to share certain characteristics, repeating over their 12/60 year cycle. The shared characteristics in this case are traits attributed to goats.

Due to the lunisolar nature of the traditional Chinese calendar system, the zodiacal year does not align with the Gregorian calendar: new years are determined by a system which results in each new year beginning on a new moon sometime between late January to mid-to-late February. Goat aspects can also enter by other chronomantic factors or measures, such as hourly.

In Chinese astrology, Goats are described as peace-loving, kind, and popular. With the addition of the Wood element, the Goat characteristic is thought to love peace and to be helpful and trusting, but yet also to be clinging and of a nature resistant to change.

Years and the Five Elements

People born within these date ranges can be said to have been born in the "Year of the Goat", while also bearing the following elemental sign:

Basic astrology elements

See also
Sheep
Goat
Bovidae in Chinese mythology
List of Chinese terrestrial ungulates

References

Further reading

Kassy Lee: The Year of the Untranslatable Animal

External links

Chinese astrological signs
Vietnamese astrological signs
Mythological caprids